Sporting Afrique Football Club was a professional football club which played in Singapore's S.League in 2006. The team was made up not of Singaporeans, but of players of African descent. Its squad consisted of players from Nigeria, Cameroon, Kenya and Ghana. The club finished in 9th place out of 11 teams in the S.League in the 2006 season. They were involved in a number of off-field controversies, and their application to participate in the S.League again in 2007 was rejected by the FAS. The club played its home games at the Yishun Stadium.

In allowing Sporting Afrique to join the league, the S.League hoped that their involvement would make the competition more exciting, and possibly unearth some good players who might be able to change their nationality to Singaporean and thus play for the Singapore national football team (as Nigerian-born Agu Casmir and Itimi Dickson had done).

In June 2006, it was reported that, while the players had been promised monthly salaries of S$1,600 (~US$1,000), they only received S$100 a month (~US$60), as S$700 was deducted for food (reportedly a monotonous diet of rice and chicken), and S$800 for accommodation despite all 22 team members living 5 or 6 per room in the same house in an area where a typical house rental was around S$3,000. Their contracts also forbade talking to the media, but team members contacted the BBC anonymously, drawing international attention. Club president Collin Chee, who had initially claimed to be "not short-changing any of them", eventually backed down and agreed to raise their salaries to S$600, with performance bonuses and better housing.

Seasons

Notable players

 Jacques Ngo'o
 Christian Priso
 Kaze Teffo Etienne

 Frederick Addai
	

 Thomas Biketi
 Harrison Muranda
 Nicholas Muyoti
 Christopher Nyangweso
	

 Segun Adebayo
 Churchill Agofure
 Lukmon Anifaloyin
 Kehinde Hussani Badmus
 Lucky Diokpara
 Julius Ejueyitsi
 Peter Lipede
 Ferdinand Nnodim
 Ifesinachi Nwaigwe
 Nwankwo Ogochukwu
 Michael Onyia
 Udo Fortune
 Obot Udoaka
 Nzekwesi Udorji
 Samuel Umoh
 Sergio Yaale

 Udo Fidelis Chika

Coach
  R. Balasubramaniam (2006 – 2007)

President
  Collin Chee (2006 – 2007)

References

 

Foreign teams in Singapore football leagues
Association football clubs established in 2006
Singapore Premier League clubs